Lee Ernest Suggs, Jr. (born August 11, 1980) is a former American football coach and former player. He played college football as a running back at Virginia Tech and professionally for the Cleveland Browns and Miami Dolphins in the National Football League (NFL).

Suggs attended high school at William Fleming High School. During his 1998 senior year in high school, he rushed for 2,918 yards and 30 touchdowns, capping a prolific high school career and helping boost his ranking among running backs to fourth in the state and 19th in the nation, according to the SuperPrep scouting organization.

While at Virginia Tech he set, and still holds the NCAA Division I Football Bowl Subdivision (FBS) records for most games scoring a touchdown in a single season (14 games in 2002), and for most consecutive games scoring a touchdown (27 consecutive games, from September 2, 2000 through December 31, 2002; 57 touchdowns). His accomplishments at the university earned him a spot in the Virginia Tech Sports Hall of Fame.

Suggs was selected by the Cleveland Browns with the 18th pick in the fourth round and 115th overall of the 2003 NFL Draft. In Week 17 of the 2003 season, Suggs rushed for 186 yards on 26 carries for two touchdowns against the Cincinnati Bengals to help the Browns finish with a 22–14 victory. One of his touchdown runs that day went 78 yards long. In 2004, Suggs had his best year as a pro, gaining 922 yards from scrimmage in only 10 games. Unfortunately, he was unable to play a full season due to several injuries as well as the acquisition of Reuben Droughns.  On August 14, 2006, Suggs was traded to the New York Jets for defensive back Derrick Strait, but the trade was voided when Suggs failed his physical, and returned to the Browns.  He was subsequently cut by the Browns.

Suggs was claimed off waivers by the Miami Dolphins on September 3, 2006.  He was released by the Dolphins on October 10, 2006.

Suggs is currently the running back coach at the Catholic University of America. He began his coaching career at Oberlin College as running backs coach in 2008.

See also
 List of NCAA major college football yearly scoring leaders

References

External links
 Catholic University profile
 Oberlin profile 
 

1980 births
Living people
American football running backs
Catholic University Cardinals football coaches
Cleveland Browns players
Miami Dolphins players
Oberlin Yeomen football coaches
Virginia Tech Hokies football players
Ed Block Courage Award recipients
Sportspeople from Roanoke, Virginia
Coaches of American football from Virginia
Players of American football from Virginia
African-American coaches of American football
African-American players of American football
20th-century African-American sportspeople
21st-century African-American sportspeople